Al Perez (born July 23, 1960) is a retired American professional wrestler. He held 16 titles during a 20-year career, including the WCWA World Heavyweight Championship.

Professional wrestling career

Early career
Perez began wrestling as an amateur in high school and was one of the top athletes in his home state of Florida. He started professional wrestling in 1982.  He wrestled in Southwest Championship Wrestling in Texas and formed a team in ICW with Joe Savoldi known as the "New York Rockers".  He then worked for the World Wrestling Council in Puerto Rico where he teamed a lot with Joe Savoldi and later feuded with Invader l.

Mid South
In 1986 Perez wrestled for Bill Watt's Mid-South Wrestling, and teamed with "Wildcat" Wendell Cooley and defeated the team of Steve" Dr. Death" Williams and Bruiser Bob Sweetan for the Mid-South Tag Team Championship. Sweetan was substituting for Ted DiBiase while DiBiase was touring Asia.

World Class
Perez went on to make a name for himself as "The Latin Heartthrob" in World Class Championship Wrestling in 1987, where he was the top heel for several months. He was managed by Gary Hart and feuded with Kevin Von Erich, Kerry Von Erich and Dingo Warrior.

Perez won the World Class Texas Championship after supposedly defeating previous champion Warrior in a phantom match in Puerto Rico on 21 June 1987.  He later defeated Kevin Von Erich for the WCWA World Heavyweight Championship by forfeit.  On 25 December 1987 he successfully defended the title in a steel cage match against Kerry Von Erich, recently returned from a 1986 motorcycle accident.  Hart and Von Erich's father Fritz were supposed to be handcuffed together but after Fritz was attacked by several heels and afterwards (kayfabe) collapsed with a suspected heart attack, Hart alone was handdcuffed to the ropes.  A distraught (kayfabe) Von Erich nonetheless went ahead with the title challenge.  Perez managed to smash Von Erich's head into the handcuffs to score the pinfall win.

Von Erich later defeated Perez for the title. Perez and Hart left for Jim Crockett Promotions.

Jim Crockett Promotions (NWA) and PWF 
In 1988, Perez moved to the National Wrestling Alliance's Jim Crockett Promotions with Hart and teamed with Larry Zbyszko along with feuding with Nikita Koloff and Dusty Rhodes. In 1989 he wrestled for Dusty Rhodes' Professional Wrestling Federation based in Florida.  He won the PWF Florida Heavyweight Title, defeating Mike Graham for the title. He later lost the title to Dustin Rhodes.

World Wrestling Federation 
Al Perez signed with WWF and made his debut on October 2, 1989, with a win over George South in a dark match at a WWF Superstars taping in Wheeling, WV. Perez was undefeated the first month, wrestling primarily on C shows against Barry Horowitz and The Brooklyn Brawler. His first loss would come against Boris Zukhov on November 13, 1989, in Roanoke, VA. Perez would then continue to wrestle primarily on the undercard, although in one Prime Time Wrestling show host Gorilla Monsoon made mention of a possible tag-team pairing of Perez and Santana. Perez was primarily seen on house shows and Prime Time Wrestling. Despite sustaining losses to the likes of Hercules and Tito Santana, Perez had many wins over wrestlers such as Paul Roma, Jim Powers, The Red Rooster, Koko B. Ware, "Bullet" Bob Bradley, Paul Diamond/Kato, Jim Brunzell, and others. His last WWF match was a win over Jim Powers on July 23, 1990, in West Palm Beach, FL.

World Championship Wrestling 
On September 5, 1990, Perez competed as The Black Scorpion, wrestling Sting in a losing effort at Clash of Champions XII. According to Ric Flair, Perez was always meant to be The Black Scorpion, but quit after finding out he was going to lose. However Perez would wrestle one more match as The Scorpion at a house show in Chicago, IL on September 30.

Global Wrestling Federation

Perez reached the finals of a tournament to crown the first GWF North American Heavyweight Champion before losing to The Patriot at the promotion's debut show on 10 August 1991 in Dallas, Texas.  However, because Perez's feet were under the ropes when he was pinned, the Patriot, as a matter of conscience (kayfabe) refused the victory and vacated the title, defeating Perez cleanly in a rematch on 23 August 1991.  Perez was (kayfabe) so impressed with his opponent's integrity and sportsmanship that he changed his ways and became a babyface once again.

Later career
Perez traveled to All Japan Wrestling and teamed with Dory Funk Jr against Dan Kroffat & Doug Furnas on December 6, 1991. He would wrestle in tag-team matches for All Japan again in 1993 and 1994. During the 90s Perez also competed in several independent promotions around the United States, including a return to Liberty All-Star Wrestling (LAW) in 2001, where he beat Jimmy Jannetty for the LAW Heavyweight title before retiring from the business in 2002.

Championships and accomplishments
Championship Wrestling from Florida
FCW Heavyweight Championship (1 time)
PWF Florida Heavyweight Championship (1 time)
Mid-South Wrestling
Mid-South Tag Team Championship (1 time) - with Wendell Cooley
NWA New Zealand
NWA Australasian Tag Team Championship (1 time) - with Mark Lewin
NWA New Zealand British Commonwealth Championship (2 times)
Pro Wrestling Illustrated
PWI ranked him # 272 of the 500 best singles wrestlers during the "PWI Years" in 2003.
Southwest Championship Wrestling
SCW Southwest Tag Team Championship (1 time) - with Manny Fernandez
 Supreme Wrestling Federation
SWF Tag Team championship (1 time) - with Paul Orndorff
Texas Wrestling Federation
TWF Heavyweight Championship (2 times)
Western States Sports
NWA Western States Tag Team Championship (1 time) - with Dennis Stamp
World Class Wrestling Association
NWA Texas Heavyweight Championship (1 time)
WCWA World Heavyweight Championship (1 time)
World Wrestling Council
WWC North American Heavyweight Championship (1 time)
WWC Puerto Rico Heavyweight Championship (1 time)
WWC World Tag Team Championship (1 time) - with Joe Savoldi

References

External links
Al Perez at Online World of Wrestling

1960 births
American male professional wrestlers
Living people
Professional wrestlers from Florida
Sportspeople from Tampa, Florida
20th-century professional wrestlers
21st-century professional wrestlers
WWC Puerto Rico Champions
NWA Florida Heavyweight Champions